The 2007 Silverstone Superbike World Championship round was the seventh round of the 2007 Superbike World Championship season. It took place on the weekend of May 25–27, 2007, at the 3.561 km Silverstone International Circuit in the United Kingdom. Troy Bayliss won the only Superbike race, as race 2 was cancelled because of heavy rain. Anthony West won the Supersport race.

Races summary
Heavy rains made for a wet first Superbike race and Supersport race at Silverstone and also caused the second Superbike race to be cancelled. 

Troy Bayliss took the win in the only Superbike race over Noriyuki Haga. Third was Troy Corser. Roberto Rolfo rode a good race to score fourth position, Regis Laconi took fifth place, his best result of the year so far. Max Biaggi finished sixth and Lorenzo Lanzi was seventh and the last rider not to be lapped by the Bayliss. 

Championship leader James Toseland crashed on lap three and he rejoined the race down in 18th place and eventually finished eighth. Ruben Xaus also fell on lap 24, allowing Toseland through, but also rejoined to finish ninth. Only 13 riders finished the race at Silverstone.

In the Supersport race, Anthony West scored a fabulous win in only his second Supersport race, proving to be the clear victor by some 33 seconds from Robbin Harms. The race was red-flagged six laps earlier than scheduled when a fallen machine blocked the racing line. Katsuaki Fujiwara was the final podium finisher. Championship leader Kenan Sofuoğlu fell on lap one and was ruled out of the points for the first time this year.

Superbike race 1 classification

Superbike race 2 cancelled

The second World Superbike race at Silverstone was cancelled due to the weather conditions.

Supersport classification

Silverstone Round
Silverstone Superbike